Churizhi (also Romanized as Chūrīzhī; also known as Chūrzhī) is a village in Shamshir Rural District, in the Central District of Paveh County, Kermanshah Province, Iran. At the 2006 census, its population was 1,858, in 456 families.

References 

Populated places in Paveh County